Beakman's World is an American educational children's television program. The program is based on the Universal Press Syndicate syndicated comic strip You Can with Beakman and Jax created by Jok Church. The series premiered on Wednesday, September 16, 1992, on TLC, and on various other channels a few days later through syndication on 220 other channels.

On September 18, 1993, it moved from national syndication to CBS's Saturday morning children's lineup. At the peak of its popularity, it was seen in nearly ninety countries around the world. The series was canceled in 1998. Reruns returned to national syndication in September 2006, after which it was transferred to local stations such as KICU. The program's host, Paul Zaloom, still performs as Beakman in live appearances around the globe.

Summary

The program starred Paul Zaloom as Beakman, an eccentric scientist who performed comical experiments and demonstrations in response to viewer mail to illustrate various scientific concepts from density to electricity to flatulence. When his experiments were successful, he would often exclaim "Zaloom!" in a nod to his last name.

Over the years, Beakman was aided in his experiments by a female assistant just as in the comic strip on which it was based. The assistant's name changed throughout the show's run; for season 1, it was Josie (played by Alanna Ubach); for seasons 2 and 3, it was Liza (played by Eliza Schneider); and for season 4, it was Phoebe (played by Senta Moses). Beakman was also assisted by his "lab rat" Lester. In the pilot episode, Lester was a puppet, but in every subsequent episode he was simply a clueless, and crude man (Mark Ritts) in a tattered rat suit. In a running joke, it was sometimes implied that his character was actually supposed to be a rat, particularly in moments where he would appear to be in pain because someone was standing on his tail, because he was being tickled, something was on his prosthetic nose, etc. Just as frequently, however, he was specifically identified by himself and others as a guy in a rat suit, or as a serious actor with a bad agent. Frequently unwilling to help with challenges or other segments, Lester was often persuaded by Beakman with the promise of food.

Another occasional cast member is the unseen cameraman "Ray", who is played by prop-master Ron Jancula's hands. Ray assists Beakman by handing him various items, such as the "boguscope". It is suggested throughout the program that Ray has a crush on the show's unnamed make-up lady. Actress Jean Stapleton also appeared on the show as Beakman's mother, "Beakmom". In some of the skits during the show the character Professor I. M. Boring (also played by Paul Zaloom, in a dual role) makes appearances and talks about various science topics.

Zaloom also appeared as various "guest scientists" and historic figures, such as Thomas A. Edison, Robert H. Goddard and Philo T. Farnsworth. When Senta Moses was added to the show's cast, the producers began to use a majority of the sound effects from the NBC game show Scrabble.

One segment of the show was the famed "Beakman Challenge". During this segment, Beakman would challenge Lester to do a stunt that illustrated a basic scientific feat. During the first season, virtually every challenge related to either air pressure or Bernoulli's principle. The show addressed this during the second season, by having Lester exclaim to Beakman (as he was explaining the science behind a trick) "AIR PRESSURE! IT'S ALWAYS AIR PRESSURE!" In later episodes, the rest of the cast would sometimes have their turn to perform a "Beakman Challenge" under their own name (e.g. "The Lester Challenge" or "The Liza Challenge", etc.) and challenge Beakman to accomplish the feat.

Before an experiment, the following verbal warning was given: "Any experiment performed at home should be done with adult supervision and all appropriate safety precautions should be taken. All directions should be followed exactly and no substitutions should be used." The same warning was given during the end credits.

At the beginning and end of the show, as well as before or after commercial breaks, the show featured short scenes portraying puppet penguins, Don (voiced by Bert Berdis) and Herb (voiced by Alan Barzman), at the South Pole watching Beakman's World on television. The penguins were named after Don Herbert, who starred as Mr. Wizard in Mr. Wizard's World. Mark Ritts (Lester) was also one of the puppeteers operating the penguins.

Beakman's World plays in weekend syndication in the United States and in several other countries. It is distributed by Sony Pictures Television in the U.S. and in other countries.

Episodes

Series overview

Season 1 (1992–1993)

Season 2 (1993–1994)

Season 3 (1995)

Season 4 (1996–1998)

Theme song
The Beakman's World theme song was composed by Mark Mothersbaugh of Devo fame. The Beakman's World theme is an amalgam of Zydeco and Synthpop. An accordion is used for its main riff. The song also prominently features a wide array of wacky sound effects.

Home media
On September 7, 2004, a DVD entitled The Best of Beakman's World was released. This DVD is a direct transfer of the VHS tape of the same name, and features only experiments and segments taken from The Beakman Challenge. There have yet to be any full-episode releases on DVD.

All 4 seasons were available on Netflix with the exception of the following five episodes: 9 (1-9), 24 (1-24), 31 (2-5), 51 (2-25) and 66 (4-1), as noted in the chart above. Their streaming license ended on September 30, 2014, and the content was removed from their site. Beakman's World returned to television on MeTV beginning on October 2, 2016, showing two episodes every Sunday.

Awards
Beakman’s World was nominated for and won numerous awards:
 Excellence in Media's Silver Angel Award (1993)
 International Monitor Award for Outstanding Audio Post Production (1993)
 Television Critics Association nomination for Outstanding Children's Program (1993)
 Ollie Award - American Center for Children's Television (1993)
 Parent's Choice Award for Outstanding Accomplishment in Children's Programming (1993)
 Daytime Emmy Award for Outstanding Achievement in Live and Tape Sound Mixing and Sound Effects (1993–1994)
 CableACE Award for Best Children's Programming 7+ older (1994)
 International Monitor Awards for Best Achievement in Children's Programming and Best Audio Post *Production in Children's Programming (1994)
 Nominated for Seven Daytime Emmy Awards including Outstanding Children's Series (1995)
 Daytime Emmy Awards (2) for Outstanding Achievement in Live and Tape Sound and Sound Effects (1994–1995).

Exhibit
In 1998, the Cincinnati Museum Center at Union Terminal opened an interactive exhibit called Beakman's World On Tour, based on the television show. The  exhibits toured dozens of cities in the United States.

References

External links
 
 
  - CBS
   - Interview

1990s American children's comedy television series
1990s American sketch comedy television series
1992 American television series debuts
1998 American television series endings
CBS original programming
Children's sketch comedy
English-language television shows
First-run syndicated television programs in the United States
Science education television series
Television shows based on comic strips
American television shows featuring puppetry
Television series by Sony Pictures Television
TLC (TV network) original programming
American children's education television series
American television series revived after cancellation